is the fourth compilation album by Japanese entertainer Miho Nakayama. Released through King Records on December 24, 1991, the album features re-recordings of Nakayama's personal selection of eight of her past songs, plus the singles "Rosa" and "Tōi Machi no Doko ka de..." The photos in the album were taken from the Wani Books photo book Scena: Miho Nakayama Pictorial.

The album peaked at No. 3 on Oricon's albums chart. It sold over 332,000 copies and was certified Platinum by the RIAJ.

Track listing

Charts

Certification

References

External links
 
 
 

1991 compilation albums
Miho Nakayama compilation albums
Japanese-language compilation albums
King Records (Japan) compilation albums